Kent Faulcon (born 1971) is an American actor, director, and writer. He has made several contributions to Black independent film festivals.

Early life 
Faulcon was born in 1971 and grew up in Raleigh, North Carolina.
Faulcon graduated from University of North Carolina School of the Arts with a bachelor's degree in Fine Arts.

Career 
In 1985, Faulcon's acting career started as a child actor in Sparks, a TV series.

Personal life 
Faulcon is married with two children.

Filmography
{| class="wikitable" style="font-size:90%;"
! colspan=3 style="background:#B0C4DE;" | Film
|- align="center"
! style="background: #CCCCCC;" | Year
! style="background: #CCCCCC;" | Film
! style="background: #CCCCCC;" | Role
|-
| 1989
| Dream a Little Dream 
| Low Life #3
|-
| 1995
| Die Hard with a Vengeance  
| Gang Member #3
|-
| rowspan=2| 1997
| Men in Black
| 2nd Lt. Jake Jensen
|-
| Red Corner
| Marine Guard
|-
| 1999
| American Beauty
| Sale House Man #3
|-
| rowspan=3| 2002
| Dragonfly
| Paul Reardon
|-
| Bug
| The Odwalla Deliveryman
|-
| Solaris
| Patient #1
|-
| 2004
| Strange Fruit
| William Boyals
|-
| 2005
| War of the Worlds
| War of the Worlds Soldier
|-
| 2014
| Selma
| Sullivan Jackson
|-
|- align="center"
! colspan=4 style="background:#B0C4DE;" | Television
|- align="center"
! style="background: #CCCCCC;" | Year
! style="background: #CCCCCC;" | Title
! style="background: #CCCCCC;" | Role
! style="background: #CCCCCC;" | Episode
|-
|1985-1988
| Sparks
| Nathan
|
|-
| 1996
| Sliders
| Billy Rae Bledsoe
| "The Good, the Bad, and the Wealthy
|-
| 1998
| The Love Boat: The Next Wave
| Greg Sanders
| "Dust, Lust, Destiny"
|-
| 1998/2000
| JAG
| Gunnery Chief (1998), L Cpl. Sheets (2000)
| "Going After Francesca" (1998), "Surface Warfare" (2000)
|-
| 1999
| Promised Land
| Oscar Davis
| "Wounded Hearts", "The Visitor"
|-
| 2000
| NYPD Blue
| Randall Dixon
| "The Irvin Files"
|-
| 2000
| Charmed
| Gil Corso
| "Chick Flick", "Murphy's Luck"
|-
| 2000
| Rude Awakening
| Henry
| "Three Men and a Womb", "Truth Don't Fail Me Now"
|-
| 2000
| Girlfriends
| Frank Anderson
| "The Importance of Being Frank"
|-
| 2001
| Strong Medicine
| Melvis 'Mel' MacRane
| "Relief"
|-
| 2002/2003
| Soul Food
| Michael King
| "Past Imperfect" (2002), "All Together Alone" (2003)
|-
| 2003
| L.A. Dragnet
| Det. Kevin Tolan
| "The Brass Ring", "All That Glitters"
|-
| 2004
| 7th Heaven
| Marine Recruiter
| "Healing Old Wounds"
|-
| 2004
| Like Family
| Dave
| "Brother's Keeper"
|-
| 2004
| Joan of Arcadia
| Duncan
| "The Cat", "Back to the Garden"
|-
| 2004
| NCIS
| Cmdr. Reynolds
| "Lt. Jane Doe"
|-
| 2005
| 24
| CHP Officer Pantell
| "Day 4: 11:00 a.m.-12:00 p.m."
|-
| 2005
| CSI: Miami
| Correctional Officer
| "Whacked"
|-
| 2006
| Vanished
| Ticket Agent
| "Warm Springs"
|-
| 2007
| Criminal Minds
| Det. Fuller
| "Distress"
|-
| 2007
| Shark
| John Ramsey
| "Trial by Fire"
|-
| 2007
| Life
| Computer Lab Tech
| "Powerless"
|-
| 2007/2008
| Lincoln Heights
| Straghan
| "Suspicion" (2007), "The New Wild Ones" (2008)
|-
| 2008
| Desperate Housewives
| Officer Ramsey
| "In Buddy's Eyes"
|-
| 2008
| Bones"
| Dr. Jason Bergman
| "The Wannabe in the Weeds"
|-
| 2008
| Boston Legal| Owen Patterson
| "The Bad Seed"
|-
| 2010
| Love That Girl!| Brian
| "A Fool for You"
|-
| 2011–2017
| Tyler Perry's For Better or Worse| Richard Ellington
|
|}

 Awards and nominations 
 Arizona Black Filmmakers Showcase
 Nominated, "Best Film"

 Hollywood Black Film Festival
 2007: Won, "Audience Choice Award" – Sister's Keeper''

 San Diego Black Film Festival
 Nominated, "Best Film"
 Nominated, "Best Director"

 San Francisco Black Film Festival
 Nominated, "Best Film"
 Nominated, "Best Director"

 Texas Black Film Festival
 2008: Won, "Audience Choice Award"
 Nominated, "Best Director"

References

External links
 

African-American male actors
American male film actors
American male television actors
African-American film directors
American film directors
Living people
20th-century American male actors
21st-century American male actors
1971 births
20th-century African-American people
21st-century African-American people